Giudice may refer to:

People
 Geoffrey Giudice (1947–2021), judge of the Federal Court of Australia
 Gian Francesco Giudice (born 1961), Italian theoretical physicist
 Teresa Giudice (born 1972), American reality television cast-member, author, and entrepreneur

Role
 Giudice, the monarch of a giudicato, an autonomous state entity in medieval Sardinia

See also
Giudici
Lo Giudice, a surname